Deokhangsan is a mountain in Odaesan National Park in the county of Pyeongchang and the city of Gangneung, Gangwon-do in South Korea.

See also
List of mountains in Korea

Notes

References

Mountains of Gangwon Province, South Korea
Pyeongchang County
Gangneung
Mountains of South Korea
One-thousanders of South Korea

zh:东台山 (江原道)